John Murphy "Pamboy" Raymundo (born May 30, 1989) is a Filipino professional basketball player who plays for the Nueva Ecija Rice Vanguards of the Maharlika Pilipinas Basketball League (MPBL). He was drafted 12th overall in 2011 by the Talk 'N Text Tropang Texters. He also played in the ASEAN Basketball League (ABL).

Early life and high school career 
Raymundo started playing basketball at the age of seven. He made it to his high school's basketball varsity team as a sophomore. His team played in the NCR meet, where he was noticed by college scouts, and renowned coach Edmundo "Ato" Badolato, who tried to recruit him for San Beda's high school team. He also participated in the 2005 Nike All-Asia Camp, along with Gian Chiu, and played against future NBA player Patty Mills.

College career
Raymundo played for the San Sebastian College-Recoletos Men's Senior Basketball team from 2006 to 2010. In 2009, he was one of the members of the San Sebastian Stags who won the title against then three-time defending champions San Beda Red Lions in a sweep 2–0.

PBA and PBA D-League career

Talk 'N Text Tropang Texters 
In the 2011 PBA Draft, Raymundo was drafted 12th overall by the Tropang Texters. He won back to back Philippine Cup titles with the team. During the 2012 Commissioner's Cup Finals, he was fined 40,000 pesos and suspended for Game 5 of that Finals for exchanging elbows with Josh Urbiztondo and punching Joe Devance in the back of the neck. He also participated in the Obstacle Challenge of the 2013 PBA All-Star Weekend. After two years, he was traded to the Air 21 Express in a three-team, multi-player trade.

Air21 Express 
After the trade, his contract was not renewed, so he never got to play for Air21.

NLEX Road Warriors (D-League) 
Raymundo attempted to return to the PBA through the PBA D-League. His team made it to the Aspirant Cup Finals that year, and won the title.

NLEX Road Warriors 
After a stint in the PBA D-League, Raymundo returned to the PBA for the NLEX Road Warriors. He played two seasons for them.

Cignal-San Beda Hawkeyes 
Raymundo scored 17 points to lead the Hawkeyes to a Finals spot. There, the Hawkeyes won their first D-League championship. They won again in that year's Foundation Cup.

ABL career 
Raymundo joined the ABL team Alab Pilipinas. He scored 20 points on 3-of-3 shooting from three in a win over the CLS Knights. His team won the 2017–18 title over the Mono Vampire. The team failed to defend the title the following season, losing to the Hong Kong Eastern Basketball in the quarterfinals.

MPBL career

Bataan Risers 
That season, the Risers won 14 straight games before losing to the San Juan Knights. Raymundo, along with Byron Villarias, won the two-ball competition during MPBL All-Star Week.

GenSan Warriors 
In the 2019–20 MPBL season, he scored 22 points and 7 assists to clinch a spot in the playoffs.

Nueva Ecija Rice Vanguards 
In 2022, Raymundo played for Nueva Ecija. He had 5 assists in a win over the Quezon City Capitals.

Career statistics

ABL 

|-
| align="left"| 2017–18
| align="left"| Alab
| 27 || 13.6 || .486 || .367 || .750 || 1.9 || 1.4 || .4 || .1 || 4.9
|-class=sortbottom
| align="center" colspan=2 | Career
| 27 || 13.6 || .486 || .367 || .750 || 1.9 || 1.4 || .4 || .1 || 4.9

PBA 
Correct as of February 9, 2022

Season-by-season averages 

|-
| align="left" | 2011–12
| align="left" | Talk 'N Text
| 26 || 7.6 || .412 || .100 || .846 || 1.2 || .9 || .2 || .0 || 1.5
|-
| align="left" | 2012–13
| align="left" | Talk 'N Text
| 31 || 6.1 || .294 || .227 || .500 || .6 || .5 || .1 || .0 || 1.2
|-
| align="left" | 2014–15
| align="left" | NLEX Road Warriors
| 24 || 7.7 || .415 || .294 || 1.000 || 1.0 || .8 || .3 || .0 || 1.8
|-
| align="left" | Career
| align="left" |
| 84 || 7.1 || .373 || .207 || .782 || .9 || .7 || .2 || .0 || 1.5

References

External links

1989 births
Living people
Air21 Express players
Basketball players from Metro Manila
Filipino men's basketball players
Maharlika Pilipinas Basketball League players
San Sebastian Stags basketball players
NLEX Road Warriors players
People from San Juan, Metro Manila
Point guards
San Miguel Alab Pilipinas players
TNT Tropang Giga players
TNT Tropang Giga draft picks